Louise Peltzer is a French Polynesian politician, former government minister, and linguist.

Biography
Peltzer is originally from Huahine in the Leeward Islands. She holds a PhD in linguistics.

She was the Minister for Culture, Higher Education and Research for French Polynesia for six years. In 2005, Peltzer was elected president of the University of French Polynesia; she was re-elected for a second term in 2009.

In June 2007 she was appointed an Officer of the Order of Tahiti Nui.

In 2011 Peltzer was accused of plagiarism; specifically, she was accused of having published material in 2000 which was taken from a book written by Umberto Eco. She resigned her position at the university in June of the same year.

Publications 

 Peltzer, L., & Conseil international de la langue française. (1985). Légendes tahitiennes. Paris: Conseil international de la langue française.

References

Living people
Year of birth missing (living people)
People from Huahine
University of French Polynesia
Ministers of Culture of French Polynesia
Higher education ministers of French Polynesia
Linguists from France
Officers of the Order of Tahiti Nui